The following outline is provided as an overview of and topical guide to the Cold War:

Cold War – period of political and military tension that occurred after World War II between powers in the Western Bloc (the United States, its NATO allies and others) and powers in the Eastern Bloc (the Soviet Union and its allies in the Warsaw Pact). Historians have not fully agreed on the dates, but 1947–1991 is common. It was termed as "cold" because there was no large-scale fighting directly between the two sides. Based on the principle of mutually assured destruction, both sides developed nuclear weapons to deter the other side from attacking. So they competed against each other via espionage, propaganda, and by supporting major regional wars, known as proxy wars, in Korea, Vietnam and Afghanistan.

Participants

Cold War participants – the Cold War primarily consisted of competition between the Eastern Bloc and the Western Bloc. While countries and organisations explicitly aligned to one or the other are listed below, this does not include those involved in specific Cold War events, such as North Korea, South Korea, and Vietnam. It also does not include countries such as China which, while not aligned to either blocs, still played an influential part in the Cold War.

Eastern Bloc 

Eastern Bloc – the communist side of the Cold War conflict, including the Soviet Union and its satellite states in Eastern Europe. Organizations that the Soviet Union created in order to solidify its control over Eastern Europe, and which tied the Eastern Bloc together, included:

  Comecon – the Council for Mutual Economic Assistance was founded in accordance with Joseph Stalin's desire to enforce Soviet domination of the lesser states of Central Europe. Initially, the Comecon served as cover for the Soviet taking of materials and equipment from the rest of the Eastern Bloc. Its members were:
 
  People's Republic of Bulgaria
  Czechoslovak Republic (Czechoslovak Socialist Republic since 1960)
  Hungarian People's Republic
  Polish People's Republic
  People's Republic of Romania (after 1965 the Socialist Republic of Romania)
 Warsaw Pact – defensive pact led by the Soviet Union for defence in Eastern Europe. It was the military complement to Comecon.  Its members were:
 
  People's Republic of Albania
  People's Republic of Bulgaria
  Czechoslovak Republic (Czechoslovak Socialist Republic since 1960)
  German Democratic Republic (withdrew in September 1990, before German reunification)
  Hungarian People's Republic
  Polish People's Republic (withdrew on January 1, 1990)
  People's Republic of Romania (after 1965 the Socialist Republic of Romania)

Additionally, the  Byelorussian Soviet Socialist Republic (Byelorussia) and the  Ukrainian Soviet Socialist Republic (Ukraine) were represented separately in the United Nations in addition to the Soviet Union. Though not parties to the Warsaw Pact, Vietnam, North Korea, Cuba and Laos, maintained Cold War alliances with the Eastern Bloc.

Western Bloc 

Western Bloc – the United States and countries allied with it against the Soviet Union and the rest of the Eastern Bloc during the Cold War. As part of its Containment policy, the United States backed a series of regional alliances:
  (North Atlantic Treaty Organization) – In the North Atlantic and Europe, NATO was formed in 1949, and its members during the Cold War were:

 - Joined 1952
 - Joined 1952
 - Joined 1955
 - Joined 1982
  SEATO (Southeast Asia Treaty Organization) – formed in 1954 for the collective defence of Southeast Asia, though disbanded in 1977. Its members were:

 - including modern Bangladesh

 ANZUS – formed in 1952 as a form of defensive cooperation in the Pacific. Its members are:
 
 
 
 CENTO (Central Treaty Organization) – formed in 1955. Although the United States did not formally join, the country did support the alliance, aimed at containing Soviet ambitions in the Middle East. The organization was disbanded in 1979.

 - Withdrew 1959

History 

Timeline of events in the Cold War

Overview articles
Cold War (1947–1953)
Cold War (1953–1962)
Cold War (1962–1979)
Cold War (1979–1985)
Cold War (1985–1991)

Beginnings 
Origins of the Cold War – the Cold war was a major part of the aftermath of World War II, and was caused by frictions in the relations between the Soviet Union and the allies (United States, United Kingdom, and France) that emerged during and after the Second World War.

Creation of organizations 

Cold War organisations – throughout the Cold War a series of organisations were created to either further the goals of individual and groups of states, or to act as intermediaries in reducing the tension.
NATO - Formed 1949
Southeast Asia Treaty Organization - Formed 1954, disbanded 1977.
Central Treaty Organization - Formed 1955, disbanded 1979.
International Atomic Energy Agency - Formed 1957
Warsaw Pact - Formed 1955, disbanded 1991.
Non-Aligned Movement - Formed 1961.

Key areas of competition 
 Nuclear arms race – competition for supremacy in nuclear warfare between the United States, the Soviet Union, and their respective allies during the Cold War.
 Space Race – 20th-century competition between two Cold War rivals, the Soviet Union (USSR) and the United States (US), for supremacy in spaceflight capability. It had its origins in the missile-based nuclear arms race between the two nations that occurred following World War II, enabled by captured German rocket technology and personnel.
 Cold War espionage
 Cold War propaganda
 Proxy wars

Conflicts 

Conflicts related to the Cold War – there were a number of conflicts during the Cold War, and none of them escalated to direct fighting between the superpowers (which would have constituted a hot war). Some of them were:

Proxy wars 

Proxy wars of the Cold War – while the superpowers never engaged each other directly, they fought a series proxy wars throughout the period of Cold War, with one, or both sides arming or otherwise supporting one side against another.

Korean War (19501953) – started when North Korea invaded South Korea. The United States and their allies came to the aid of the South, while China and the Soviet Union came to the aid of the North.
Vietnam War (19551975) – fought primarily between North Vietnam and South Vietnam. The United States and their allies came to the aid of the South, while China, the Soviet Union and others came to the aid of the North. Fighting occurred in Vietnam, along with neighboring Laos and Cambodia. 
South African Border War (19661989) – fought between South Africa and its allies on one side, with the Angolan government and its allies, including Cuba, on the other. During the conflict, the United States supplied South Africa and their allies.
Yom Kippur War (1973) – started when an Arab coalition led by Egypt and Syria launched a surprise attack on Israel. Throughout the conflict the United States and the Soviet Union heavily supplied Israel and the Arab coalition, respectively.
Soviet–Afghan War (19791989) – fought between the Soviet Union and allied Afghan forces on one side, against the insurgent groups known as the Mujahideen. The insurgent groups received aid, and training in Pakistan and China, paid for by the United States and Arab monarchies in the Persian Gulf.

Periods of heightened tension 
US-USSR confrontations during the Cold War – while open conflict did not break out between the two superpowers during the Cold War, there were some very intense confrontations that seemed likely to trigger World War III. As the Cold War stretched on, the main concern became the possibility of a nuclear exchange—the ultimate fear characterizing East-West tensions.  Some of these confrontations included:
 
 Berlin Blockade (19481949) – while located wholly within the Soviet zone of Allied-occupied Germany after World War II, Berlin was not considered to be part of the Soviet zone. The major city (and former Nazi capital) was jointly occupied by the Allied powers and subdivided into four sectors. On 24 June 1948 to 12 May 1949, the Soviet Union blocked the Western Allies' railway, road, and canal access to Berlin. Not to be outdone, the Western Allies organized a massive air lift and flew up to 8,893 tons of necessities into the city each day.
 Berlin Crisis of 1961 – the USSR demanded the withdrawal of NATO armed forces from West Berlin. After the West Bloc refused, the East German government put up the Berlin Wall to block traffic between the Western and Eastern sectors of Berlin.
 Cuban Missile Crisis (October 16–28, 1962) – 13-day confrontation between the United States and the Soviet Union concerning Soviet ballistic missile deployment in Cuba. Along with being televised worldwide, it was the closest the Cold War came to escalating into a full-scale nuclear war.
 Able Archer 83 (1983) – NATO exercise mistaken by parts of the KGB, Politburo, and Soviet Armed Forces as cover for an attack. The USSR responded by readying its forces for war.

Ending 
End of the Cold War – While many observers state the 1989 Malta Summit was the end of the Cold War, it was December 1991 before the Presidents of the United States and the Soviet Union formally recognised the conflict's end, with the Soviet Union also being dissolved at that time. Some key events leading up to the end include:

 Removal of Hungary's border fence with Austria (1989) –
 Fall of the Wall (1989) –
 Malta Summit (1989) – 
 German reunification (1990) – 
 Warsaw Pact dissolved (1991) – Between 1989 and 1991, Communist governments were deposed by popular uprisings in Poland, Hungary, Czechoslovakia, East Germany, Romania and Bulgaria; effectively ending the Warsaw Pact.
 Dissolution of the Soviet Union (1991) –
 Belavezha Accords (1991) – agreement that declared the Soviet Union effectively dissolved and established the Commonwealth of Independent States (CIS) in its place.

Aftermath 
 Effects of the Cold War
 New world order
 Post–Cold War era

Cold War foreign policy and diplomacy 
 Superpower disengagement
 Trust, but verify

Influential people

Military personnel 
Stanislav Petrov
Vasily Arkhipov

National leaders

The United States 
Harry S. Truman - 19451953
Dwight D. Eisenhower - 19531961
John F. Kennedy - 19611963
Lyndon B. Johnson - 19631969
Richard Nixon - 19691974
Gerald Ford - 19741977
Jimmy Carter - 19771981
Ronald Reagan - 19811989
George H. W. Bush - 19891993

Soviet Union 
Joseph Stalin - 19221953
Georgy Malenkov - 1953
Nikita Khrushchev - 19531964
Leonid Brezhnev - 19641982
Yuri Andropov - 19821984
Konstantin Chernenko - 19841985
Mikhail Gorbachev - 19851991

See also 

 Cold War II, for tensions that arise between Eastern and Western powers after the Cold War
 Canada in the Cold War
 Cold War in Asia
 Cold War (TV series)
 Culture during the Cold War
 Danube River Conference of 1948
 Finlandization
 Index of Soviet Union-related articles
 The Internet during the Cold War
 List of Soviet Union–United States summits
 McCarthyism
 Mutually assured destruction
 Post–World War II economic expansion
 Soviet Empire
 Soviet espionage in the United States
 Timeline of events in the Cold War
 World War III

Notes

References

Further reading
 Brune, Lester, and Richard Dean Burns.  Chronology of the Cold War: 1917–1992 (2005), : 720 pp
 Tucker, Spencer, et al. eds. The Encyclopedia of the Cold War: A Political, Social, and Military History (5 vol., 2007) 1969pp

External links 

Archives
 An archive of UK civil defence material
 Post-Cold War World Economy from the Dean Peter Krogh Foreign Affairs Digital Archives
 CONELRAD Cold War Pop Culture Site
 CBC Digital ArchivesCold War Culture: The Nuclear Fear of the 1950s and 1960s
 The Cold War International History Project (CWIHP)
 The Cold War Files
 Documents available online regarding aerial intelligence during the Cold War, Dwight D. Eisenhower Presidential Library
Bibliographies
 Annotated bibliography for the arms race from the Alsos Digital Library
News
 Video and audio news reports from during the cold war
Educational Resources
 Minuteman Missile National Historic Site: Protecting a Legacy of the Cold War, a National Park Service Teaching with Historic Places (TwHP) lesson plan
 Electronic Briefing Books at the National Security Archive, George Washington University

Cold War
Cold War